Tim Aline Rebeaud (born April 11, 1972 in Geneva, Switzerland) is known for her charity work and for the foundation of the NGO Maison Chance in Vietnam. Maison Chance is a social structure helping street children, orphans, and disadvantaged and handicapped people in Vietnam. Aline Rebeaud was given the name "Tim" – "heart" in Vietnamese. Today, she has the dual citizenship, she is Swiss and Vietnamese. Her complete Vietnamese name is Hoang Nu Ngoc Tim.

Maison Chance 
History of Maison Chance begins in 1993. Aline Rebeaud was then a young painter who, during a trip to Vietnam, met an orphan named Thanh in the psychiatric treatment center of Thu Duc . Thanh, then 10 years old,  suffered from cardiovascular, liver and lungs disorders. The treating physicians expected him to live for no more than a few days . Aline decided to take charge over his case and brought him to the hospital. The woman was taking care of the boy during the whole 3 months stay at the hospital. That's when Aline got her nickname "Tim", "heart" in Vietnamese. Since that time Aline is using her nickname instead of her given name. After leaving the hospital rented a house in Ho Chi Minh City, where she moved in with the boy. Over the first few months there she invited more disabled people to live together in her apartment. That's when, in 1993, she decided to establish a foundation, Maison Chance, meant for disadvantaged people in Vietnam. In 1998, Maison Chance received official recognition from Vietnamese authorities as a humanitarian non-governmental organization, free from all political or religious allegiance. Over time the organization grew and from a single house became 3 centers: the Shelter, the Take Wings Center and Village Chance. Each center has a specific role:
 The Shelter offers a housing for the most disadvantaged people and can welcome up to 70 people. The beneficiaries are given accommodation and food. In order to be allowed staying at the shelter, they are required to attend school or follow a vocational training. 
 The Take Wings Center, opened in 2006, is a vocational training center. The compound includes:
– Offices (Vietnamese and international)  
– A medical care and rehabilitation space with an infirmary and a kinesiotherapy room  
– Vocational training workshops adapted to the handicapped. The center offers workshops in painting, sewing, semi-precious stonecutting, bamboo woodwork, and IT. Some of the participants later take up work for remuneration at Maison Chance   
– A wheelchair repair workshop to fix vehicles for people with reduced mobility 
 Village Chance, opened in 2011. It's amenities include:
– A daycare and a primary school that is free for all Maison Chance residents and disadvantaged children from the neighborhood. In total, over 250 students attend the school  
– 30 apartments, adapted to people with reduced mobility.  rented for a price lower than the average market price. The apartments are rented to families that have at least one handicapped person. As of 2017, over 110 people were living in Village Chance  
– A bakery and a restaurant. Besides selling their goods, the bakery and the restaurant offer vocational training to young people in difficult situations. Workshops are held by Maison Chance beneficiaries  
– An aquatic therapy pool heated by special pumps produced in Canada. Weekly therapy sessions are organized there with the paramedical staff

In 2017, more than 500 people benefited from Maison Chance care and services. The organization counted more than 70 employees.

 The fourth social center is being built in Krong No district, in Dak Nong province, Vietnam Central Highlands. The center is intended for severely handicapped or aging people, unable to take up paid employment despite the services offered by Maison Chance. They would be sent to the center in Dak Nong Province. Maison Chance social center in Dak Nong will offer types of therapy, still uncommon in Vietnam. These include equine-assisted therapy and horticultural therapy. The opening of the Dak Nong social center is planned for the year 2018.

Book 
Tim, encouraged by her father Laurent, wrote a book about Maison Chance. The book is an autobiography recounting her journey and the story around Maison Chance. It came out in French in 2013, under the title “Maison Chance, un avenir pour les moins chanceux au Vietnam”. Its first part recounts Tim Aline's life since 1993, the second part gathers testimonies of 14 Maison Chance beneficiaries. In 2017, the book was published in Vietnamese under the title "Nhà may mắn, một tương lai cho những người thiếu may mắn". The Vietnamese edition was published under Aline's Vietnamese name, chosen when she received citizenship of Vietnam, Hoang Nu Ngoc Tim. The book is in the process of being translated into English.

Awards and honors 
 2017: VUFO Award – Maison Chance received the VUFO (Vietnam Union of Friendship Organizations) Award for its meaningful contribution to Vietnam's socio-economic development from 2013 to 2017.
 2015: Ho Chi Minh City People's Committee Prize – Tim and Maison Chance received the Ho Chi Minh City People’s Committee Price for their excellent achievements in implementing humanitarian programs and projects in Ho Chi Minh City for many years (from 2010 to 2012).
 2014: VUFO Award – Maison Chance received the VUFO (Vietnam Union of Friendship Organizations) Award for its contribution to the socio-economic development of Vietnam in 2014.
 2012: HUFO Award – Maison Chance received the HUFO (Ho Chi Minh City Union of Friendship Organizations) Award for its positive contribution to the development of the city in 2011.
 2011: HUFO Award – Maison Chance received the HUFO (Ho Chi Minh City Union of Friendship Organizations) Award for its positive contribution to the development of the city in 2010.
 2011: Medal of Labor Order – awarded to Tim by the President of the Socialist Republic of Vietnam himself.
 2010: VUFO Award – Maison Chance received the VUFO (Vietnam Union of Friendship Organizations) Award for its contribution to poverty reduction and its help to Vietnam’s development.
 2010: HUFO Award – Maison Chance received the HUFO (Ho Chi Minh City Union of Friendship Organizations) Award for its positive to the development of the city in 2009.
 2010: Binh Tan District People's Committee Prize – awarded for Aline's contribution to the development of that district from 2005 to 2009.
 2010: Ho Chi Minh City People's Committee Prize – Tim and Maison Chance received the award for support to poor people, handicapped people, and disadvantaged children.
 2008: EEDCM Medal –  given by the French Association EEDCM (Etoile Européenne du Dévouement Civil et Militaire)
 2008: « Main dans la Main » Prize – awarded by the Swiss association Main dans la Main. 2002: Henry Dunant Field Prize – This prize was awarded to Tim by the International Red Cross.''

References

External links 
 
 The story of Maison Chance
 
 Trai Tim Aline
 "Tim Aline Rebeaud" by Coco Tâche-Berther published on December 11, 2015 on 7sky.life 
 The legacy of Maison Chance Orphanage and Village: an interview with Tim Aline Rebeaud by Dr. Stephen Bui, published on May 20, 2018 on Archive Storycorps
 Angel Shine Foundation
 Vietnam Breaking News
 "L'incroyable parcours de la Suissesse Tim et sa Maison Chance" by Philippe Kottelat, published on December 17, 2014 on GHI

1972 births
Living people